Diisopropylzinc is an organozinc compound with the chemical formula 
ZnC6H14.

It is the key reagent in the Soai reaction, which is both autocatalytic and enantiospecific. This chemical is pyrophoric, bursting into flame in air or in contact with water. It is generally packaged in toluene.

References

Organozinc compounds
Isopropyl compounds